The Alabama Crimson Tide softball team represents the University of Alabama in NCAA Division I college softball.  The team participates in the Western Division of the Southeastern Conference (SEC). It is currently led by head coach Patrick Murphy and assistant coaches Alyson Habetz and Stephanie VanBrakle. The team plays its home games at the Rhoads Stadium located on the university's campus.  The Alabama Crimson Tide softball team won its first National Championship in 2012, after they defeated the Oklahoma Sooners in the championship series of the Women's College World Series.

History
On September 28, 1995, Alabama athletics director Glen Tuckett announced the school would sponsor a softball program to begin play in the 1997 season. At the time of its addition, softball became both the 20th varsity sport overall and 11th women's sport sponsored at Alabama. On January 3, 1996, Kalum Haack was hired from Kansas to serve as the first head coach for the team. The next spring, Haack recruited his first class for the inaugural 1997 team. On February 15, 1997, Alabama defeated Tulsa 5–2 in their first all-time game at ASA Hall of Fame Stadium in Oklahoma City. Two weeks later, the Crimson Tide won their first all-time home game in their home opener at Sokol Park against Delta State 4–3.

After he led the Crimson Tide in their inaugural season and to their first SEC championship in their second season, on June 30, 1998, Haack resigned as head coach. He cited personal reasons for his resignation. During his two-year stint as head coach, Haack compiled an overall record of 78 wins and 47 losses (78–47). A week later on July 9, Alabama assistant coach Patrick Murphy was promoted to the Crimson Tide's head coach position.

Since Murphy took over in 1999, the Crimson Tide has won 12 SEC championships (6 regular season and 6 tournaments), made 17 consecutive NCAA tournaments (every year since 1999) and have advanced to the Women's College World Series ten times. In 2012, Alabama defeated the Oklahoma Sooners, 2 games to 1, in the championship series of the Women's College World Series, to win its first national championship in school history and the first softball national championship in the history of the SEC.

Head coaches

Year-by-year records

NCAA Tournament seeding history
National seeding began in 2005. The Alabama Crimson Tide are one of only three teams to have a national seed every year, along with Florida and Tennessee.

Awards and honors

National awards
NFCA National Pitcher of the Year
Montana Fouts (2021)

D1Softball Pitcher of the Year
Montana Fouts (2021)

Conference awards
SEC Player of the Year
Charlotte Morgan (2009, 2010)
Bailey Hemphill (2021)

SEC Pitcher of the Year
Stephanie VanBrakle (2006)
Kelsi Dunne (2010, 2011)
Jackie Traina (2012, 2014)
Sarah Cornell (2019)
Montana Fouts (2021)

SEC Freshman of the Year
Lacy Prejean (2000)
Jackie McClain (2001)
Stephanie VanBrakle (2003)
Brittany Rogers (2006)
Kelsi Dunne (2008)
Amanda Locke (2009)
Kayla Braud (2010)
Alexis Osorio (2015)
Montana Fouts (2019)

Alabama's Louisville Slugger/NFCA All-Americans

†Denotes 1st Team selection

See also
List of NCAA Division I softball programs

References
General

 

Specific

External links
 

 
Sports clubs established in 1997
1997 establishments in Alabama